Cold Steel is a 1987 American thriller film directed by Dorothy Ann Puzo, and starring Brad Davis, Sharon Stone, Jonathan Banks, and Adam Ant. It was Anthony LaPaglia's film debut.

Plot
It begins when detective Johnny Modine (Brad Davis) gets his Christmas celebration spoiled with the news about his father's death, which is the work of psychopathic junkies who slashed the old man to death while robbing his store. Johnny is determined to find the person responsible and get his revenge, even if it means the end of his police career.

Johnny doesn't know that the murder was actually part of a sinister revenge plot directed against him. Leader of those murderous thugs is his former friend and colleague Isaac (Jonathan Banks) who blames Johnny for the incident that left him crippled many years ago. But before he gets to Isaac, Johnny must overcome many obstacles, including Kathy (Sharon Stone), an attractive but mysterious woman with a hidden agenda.

Cast
 Brad Davis as Detective Johnny Modine
 Sharon Stone as Kathy Connors
 Jonathan Banks as Isaac "Iceman"
 Jay Acovone as "Cookie"
 Adam Ant as Dorian "Mick" Michael Duran
 Eddie Egan as Lieutenant Hill
 Sy Richardson as Rashid
 Anne Haney as Anna Modine
 Ron Karabatsos as Fishman
 William Lanteau as Sam Modine
 Mindy Seeger as Wanda
 Pat Asanti as Sergeant Yancy
 James Scally as O'Reilly
 Michael Warren as Eddie
 John Wheeler as Mahoney
 Peter DeAnello as Tito
 Jesse Aragon as Gang Leader
 Heidi Kozak as Gang Girl
 Robert Cervi as "Tatoo"
 Anthony LaPaglia as "Spooky"
 Nick Savage as "T-Bone"
 Jack Shea as "Spread'Em"

Home media
After the film's theatrical run, the film was released on videocassette in March 1988 by RCA/Columbia Pictures Home Video. On December 2, 2002, Columbia TriStar Home Video released the film on DVD.

References

External links
 
 
 

1987 films
1987 thriller films
American Christmas films
American police detective films
CineTel Films films
American thriller films
1980s English-language films
1980s American films